The Siemens S200 is a high-floor light rail vehicle (LRV) manufactured by Siemens Mobility in Florin, California. The S200 succeeds the SD-100, SD-160, SD-400 and SD-460 as the high-floor light rail vehicle for the North American market and is being manufactured and marketed alongside the low-floor Siemens S700.

Operators

Calgary

In September 2013, 60 light rail vehicles were ordered, costing $200 million, for the Calgary CTrain; the order was later slightly expanded to 63 LRVs at a cost of $201.6 million. The first car was delivered on January 6, 2016.

Later, an additional 6 cars were ordered. The first of this order was delivered in May 2019 and was put into service on July 11, 2019.

In February 2020, 15 more LRVs were ordered bringing the total fleet to 84 S200 LRVs.

The new cars feature a host of new and upgraded technologies. Heated floors and triple-pane windows were added to combat Calgary's harsh winter climate, as well as sloped entryways to eliminate moving ramps found on older trains. A new speaker system adjusts the volume output depending on the amount of passengers in each car. Dynamic interior LED lights adjust to become brighter when its dark and dimmer when light is shining through the windows. The end doors were moved back to improve passenger flow and include LED lights to indicate if a door can be opened or if it is closing/locked. New infotainment systems were added alongside LED info signs to display next stop and line information. It is also capable of showing advertisements, although it has not been implemented yet. Some of these features (LCD information screens, security cameras, LED exterior signs) have been implemented on the refurbished Siemens SD-160 cars as part of mid-lifecycle refurbishment.

San Francisco
Siemens have designated the S200 light rail vehicles for San Francisco as S200 SF; internally, the San Francisco Municipal Transportation Agency have designated them LRV4, succeeding prior LRV designs from Boeing-Vertol (LRV1) and AnsaldoBreda (LRV2 and LRV3).

The initial contract ordered 175 LRVs, totalling $648 million, for San Francisco's Muni Metro in September 2014. Option 1 for an additional 40 was exercised in June 2015 at an anticipated cost of $176 million. Four more LRVs were ordered in June 2017 for $16 million to handle an expected increase in traffic after the Golden State Warriors move to the Chase Center in 2019. Option 2 was partially exercised to order an additional 30 in August 2021 for $130 million. The remainder of Option 2 (which was for up to 45 additional) was forfeited. This makes the total firm orders 249 LRVs. The order is divided into a "replacement fleet" of 151 LRVs to replace Muni's existing fleet of Breda LRV2/3s, a "future fleet" of 68 to accommodate expanded ridership after the completion of the Central Subway and Chase Center, and a "second expansion fleet" of 30.

Deliveries of the "future fleet" began in January 2017. The first Muni unit entered service on November 17, 2017. The "future fleet" deliveries completed in October 2019. Deliveries of LRVs for the "replacement fleet" are scheduled to begin in 2021.

Reliability
One of the primary concerns for the LRV4 fleet in San Francisco was improving the mean distance between failures (MDBF) compared to the existing Breda LRV2/3 fleet.

Seating

Ridership surveys and SFMTA staff recommendations resulted in an all-longitudinal seating configuration for the initial "future fleet" delivery of 68 LRVs, where seats are placed along the long sides of the car, rather than lateral seating, where seats face the front and back of the vehicle. The longitudinal seating creates wider aisles, is preferred by advocates for the disabled, provides more room for standing passengers, and may accommodate bicycles on board, as the bicycle policy only allows folding bikes on board.

However, in "future fleet" of 68 LRV4s, the long benches were flat and lacked the individual seating pockets used in the Breda longitudinal benches. In a November 2019 report, Muni provided details for a retrofit of the already-delivered "future fleet": half the flat longitudinal benches will be replaced with single transverse seats, and the other half will be replaced with individual longitudinal seats. For the "replacement fleet" of 151 cars, 50 will be delivered with seating to match the retrofitted "future fleet" of 68; the remaining 101 will have double transverse seats instead of the single transverse seats.

Doors
In April 2019, funding for additional cars was suspended after two notable incidents were reported in local media. The San Francisco Examiner reported that on April 12, after a passenger's hand became trapped in the door, she was dragged along as the car departed the station platform; although she managed to pull herself free, she then lost her balance, fell from the platform, striking the train, and landed unconscious on the tracks. It was the fourth reported incident where passengers were trapped by doors on the LRV4; of those, two resulted in injuries.

As a temporary measure, the rear doors on LRV4s were locked shut to prevent additional trapped passengers; the San Francisco Board of Supervisors voted to withhold $62 million for additional cars approximately one week after the door and shear pin issues. Muni began testing a fix to the single panel doors on May 16, car no. 2036 began testing the improved sensitive edges, with one operator driving and another monitoring the rear door. Muni announced the fixes to the doors had been implemented successfully and normal operation resumed in June 2019. In the original door sensor design, only one sensing strip was installed on the interior surface of the door edge to detect objects or hands; two more edge strips were added to fix the issue, both on the exterior surface of the door edge.

Couplers

In a separate incident which also occurred on April 12, a shear pin failed at the yard when a two-car train was being uncoupled after leaving service for the day. Each coupler is designed with two shear pins; the shear pin is designed to break to protect the coupling mechanism. An inspection found another shear pin had failed on another uncoupled car; Muni suspended coupled operation of the LRV4s as a result. The door and coupler issues prompted the California Public Utilities Commission to launch an investigation.

Unclear instructions led to adjustment of the coupler height via the inclination screw; this in turn pushed the coupler lateral stop bracket out of position, enabling excessive lateral travel, which caused the shear pins to break. Maintenance instructions were updated, the lateral stop bracket assembly was redesigned, and the travel of the coupler adjustment screw was limited to fix the issue. The redesigned couplers went into service in June 2019.

In December 2019, Muni announced it would run uncoupled cars again because the new shear pins became unreliable after three months' use; a redesign was being studied. The issue was discovered after a shear pin failed in fatigue; although the two cars remained coupled, the operator "felt like her train was being continually rear ended". Siemens reported the issue affects all 68 cars in the "future fleet". Siemens and the manufacturer of the couplers, Voith, identified potential causes for the fatigue failure of the shear pins. The existing design is sufficient to allow coupled operation of the cars for at least 90 days, and new shear pins were being provided as a warranty item until the issue has been resolved. The shear pins were failing due to the sudden change in gradient at intersections.

Brakes

At the Board of Supervisors meeting in April 2019, Muni officials also reported the wheels on the LRV4s required resurfacing before their expected end-of-life because of the use of emergency brakes, which are engaged once a week, on average. At any given time, only half (or fewer) of the LRV4s were available for service because of wheels with flat spots caused by emergency braking.

In typical operation, the LRV is both accelerated and braked using a "T" handle controller at the operator's left hand; an emergency stop can be commanded using either the red 'mushroom button' on the forward control panel, or by the "T" handle. For the Breda LRV2/3, the "T" handle is pulled out and twisted 90 degrees for the emergency stop; for the Siemens LRV4, the "T" handle is only pulled out. This difference meant that for the Breda LRVs, it was usually quicker to use the 'mushroom button' to command an emergency stop; there was essentially no difference for the Siemens LRVs. Because the 'stick' brakes on the prior Breda LRV2/3 cars were prone to failure, operators were trained to use the 'mushroom button' when encountering obstacles on the tracks. However, using the 'mushroom button' on the LRV4s, as operators were trained, locked-up the wheels and flattened the wheel surface.

A plan was announced in November 2019 to add track brakes to the powered end trucks; the design for the track brakes was submitted to the CPUC for approval. Track brakes were already equipped on the center (unpowered) truck, but the combination of the wheel brakes and the existing single-truck track brake led to flat-spotting the wheels each time an emergency stop was commanded. Testing of an LRV4 retrofitted with additional track brakes showed the rate of flat-spotting wheels during emergency stops fell from nearly 100% to just 0.4%.

References

External links

Light rail vehicles
Siemens tram vehicles
Electric multiple units of the United States
Articulated passenger trains
600 V DC multiple units
CTrain
Muni Metro
Train-related introductions in 2015
Electric multiple units of Canada
Siemens multiple units